The WAFF Futsal Championship is a futsal competition organised by the West Asian Football Federation.

Results

Medal summary

Participating nations

Legend

 – Champions
 – Runners-up
 – Third place
 – Fourth place
 – Semi-final (no third place match)

GS – Group stage
Q — Qualified for upcoming tournament
 — Did not participate
 — Hosts

By debut

All-time table

See also 
WAFF Championship
WAFF Women's Futsal Championship

References

External links 
2007 WAFF Futsal Championship results
2009 WAFF Futsal Championship results 
2012 WAFF Futsal Championship results
Futsalplanet.com

 
International futsal competitions
International association football competitions in the Middle East
Futsal competitions in Asia